Benjamin Bickley Rogers (11 December 1828 – 22 September 1919) was an English classical scholar.

Rogers was born in Shepton Montague, Somerset in 1828.

He was educated at Highgate School and Wadham College, Oxford, where he became President of the Oxford Union in 1853. He was elected a Fellow of the college in 1852 and was called to the bar in 1856. He gave up a successful legal practice when increasing deafness obliged him to retire.

He then devoted himself exclusively to literature. He translated all the plays of Aristophanes, reproducing the Greek metres in the English version.  Some of the comic verses use the metre of the Major-General's song in Gilbert and Sullivan's H.M.S. Pinafore.

In March 1902 he was elected an Honorary Fellow of Wadham College.

Rogers died in Twickenham on 22 September 1919.

Sources

External link

1828 births
1919 deaths
English classical scholars
Alumni of Wadham College, Oxford
Fellows of Wadham College, Oxford
English barristers
People educated at Highgate School
Presidents of the Oxford Union
19th-century English lawyers